In mathematics, specifically in symplectic geometry, the symplectic sum is a geometric modification on symplectic manifolds, which glues two given manifolds into a single new one. It is a symplectic version of connected summation along a submanifold, often called a fiber sum.

The symplectic sum is the inverse of the symplectic cut, which decomposes a given manifold into two pieces. Together the symplectic sum and cut may be viewed as a deformation of symplectic manifolds, analogous for example to deformation to the normal cone in algebraic geometry.

The symplectic sum has been used to construct previously unknown families of symplectic manifolds, and to derive relationships among the Gromov–Witten invariants of symplectic manifolds.

Definition 
Let  and  be two symplectic -manifolds and  a symplectic -manifold, embedded as a submanifold into both  and  via

such that the Euler classes of the normal bundles are opposite:

In the 1995 paper that defined the symplectic sum, Robert Gompf proved that for any orientation-reversing isomorphism

there is a canonical isotopy class of symplectic structures on the connected sum

meeting several conditions of compatibility with the summands . In other words, the theorem defines a symplectic sum operation whose result is a symplectic manifold, unique up to isotopy.

To produce a well-defined symplectic structure, the connected sum must be performed with special attention paid to the choices of various identifications.

Generalizations 

Additionally, the sum can be performed simultaneously on submanifolds  of equal dimension and meeting  transversally.

Other generalizations also exist.

A symplectic sum along a submanifold of codimension  requires a symplectic involution of a -dimensional annulus. If this involution exists, it can be used to patch two -dimensional balls together to form a symplectic -dimensional sphere. Because the sphere is a compact manifold, a symplectic form  on it induces a nonzero cohomology class

But this second cohomology group is zero unless . So the symplectic sum is possible only along a submanifold of codimension two.

Identity element 

So for any particular pair  there exists an identity element  for the symplectic sum. Such identity elements have been used both in establishing theory and in computations; see below.

Symplectic sum and cut as deformation 

It is sometimes profitable to view the symplectic sum as a family of manifolds.

in which the central fiber is the singular space

(That is, the generic fibers are all members of the unique isotopy class of the symplectic sum.)

Loosely speaking, one constructs this family as follows. Choose a nonvanishing holomorphic section  of the trivial complex line bundle

Then, in the direct sum

for a chosen small . One can glue both  (the summands with  deleted) onto this locus; the result is the symplectic sum .

As  varies, the sums  naturally form the family  described above. The central fiber  is the symplectic cut of the generic fiber. So the symplectic sum and cut can be viewed together as a quadratic deformation of symplectic manifolds.

An important example occurs when one of the summands is an identity element . This is analogous to deformation to the normal cone along a smooth divisor  in algebraic geometry. In fact, symplectic treatments of Gromov–Witten theory often use the symplectic sum/cut for "rescaling the target" arguments, while algebro-geometric treatments use deformation to the normal cone for these same arguments.

However, the symplectic sum is not a complex operation in general. The sum of two Kähler manifolds need not be Kähler.

History and applications 

The symplectic sum was first clearly defined in 1995 by Robert Gompf. He used it to demonstrate that any finitely presented group appears as the fundamental group of a symplectic four-manifold. Thus the category of symplectic manifolds was shown to be much larger than the category of Kähler manifolds.

Around the same time, Eugene Lerman proposed the symplectic cut as a generalization of symplectic blow up and used it to study the symplectic quotient and other operations on symplectic manifolds.

A number of researchers have subsequently investigated the behavior of pseudoholomorphic curves under symplectic sums, proving various versions of a symplectic sum formula for Gromov–Witten invariants. Such a formula aids computation by allowing one to decompose a given manifold into simpler pieces, whose Gromov–Witten invariants should be easier to compute. Another approach is to use an identity element  to write the manifold  as a symplectic sum

References 
 Robert Gompf: A new construction of symplectic manifolds, Annals of Mathematics 142 (1995), 527-595
 Dusa McDuff and Dietmar Salamon: Introduction to Symplectic Topology (1998) Oxford Mathematical Monographs, 
 Dusa McDuff and Dietmar Salamon: J-Holomorphic Curves and Symplectic Topology (2004) American Mathematical Society Colloquium Publications, 

Symplectic topology